Junius Myer Schine (February 20, 1890 – May 9, 1971) was a New York theater and hotel magnate whose holdings comprised 185 movie theaters, notably, Glove Theatre, and Schines Auburn Theatre, and several hotels, including Ambassador Hotel.

Biography
He was born on February 20 or February 28, 1890 to a Jewish family in Latvia. In 1902, as an eleven-year-old, he, his brother Louis Schine (1892–1977), age nine, and their mother, Anne, emigrated from what is now Latvia to join their father in Gloversville, New York.

He married Hildegarde Feldman (1903–1994). They had two daughters, Doris June Schine Maxwell and Renee Helene Schine Crown (wife of Lester Crown), and two sons, Gerard David Schine (usually known as G. David or David) and Charles Richard Schine.

In 1957, Junius chose his son David, a central figure in the Army-McCarthy Hearings of 1954, to head Schine Enterprises, but in 1963, Junius resumed his position as head of the company. In 1965, Schine's holdings were bought by Lawrence Wien and Harry B. Helmsley. Junius died on May 9, 1971, in Manhattan, New York City.

Legacy
Renee Helene Schine Crown made a $2,500,000 contribution to Syracuse University in 1984 for the Schine Student Center, which opened in October 1985.

Patent
In 1965, Schine received Patent GB1002524 for a golf training apparatus that evaluated whether a stroke was a slice or a hook and calculated the distance the golf ball would have gone. The patent is no longer active.

References

1890 births
1971 deaths
American real estate businesspeople
American people of Latvian-Jewish descent
Latvian Jews
Emigrants from the Russian Empire to the United States